Minuca is a genus of crabs belonging to the family Ocypodidae.

The species of this genus are found in America.

Species

Species:

Minuca argillicola 
Minuca brevifrons 
Minuca burgersi 
Minuca minax 
Minuca ecuadoriensis 
Minuca galapagensis 
Minuca herradurensis 
Minuca longisignalis 
Minuca marguerita 
Minuca mordax 
Minuca osa 
Minuca pugnax 
Minuca rapax 
Minuca umbratila 
Minuca victoriana 
Minuca virens 
Minuca vocator 
Minuca zacae

References

Ocypodoidea
Decapod genera